HBY may refer to:
 Hartlebury railway station, in England
 Hornsby railway station, in Sydney, Australia
 Hybridon, a former American biotechnology company